Yassine Jebbour  (born 24 January 1991) is a former professional footballer who played as a right back. Born in France, he represented Morocco at international level.

Club career
In July 2015 Jebbour joined SC Bastia on a three-year contract, as part of a deal that saw Ryad Boudebouz join Montpellier HSC.

Jebbour announced his retirement in 2016.

International career
Jebbour was named in Pim Verbeek's 18-man squad for the Morocco U-23 football team to compete at the London 2012 Olympics. He made his senior international début on 8 June 2013 in an official match against Tanzania.

Personal life
In May 2016, Jebbour was taken into custody for "voluntary violence" towards a police officer after being arrested while driving drunk.

References

External links

Profile at Stade Rennais F.C.

1991 births
Living people
Moroccan footballers
Morocco international footballers
French footballers
French sportspeople of Moroccan descent
Sportspeople from Poitiers
Stade Rennais F.C. players
AS Nancy Lorraine players
Montpellier HSC players
S.S.D. Varese Calcio players
SC Bastia players
Ligue 1 players
Serie B players
Olympic footballers of Morocco
Footballers at the 2012 Summer Olympics
Association football fullbacks
Footballers from Nouvelle-Aquitaine
Expatriate footballers in Italy
Moroccan expatriate sportspeople in Italy
French expatriate sportspeople in Italy
French expatriate footballers
Moroccan expatriate footballers